Maria Elisabeth "Marlies" van der Putten (born 23 January 1968) is a Dutch former softball player. She played as a infielder for the Netherlands women's national softball team and Terrasvogels.

She competed in the women's tournament at the 1996 Summer Olympics.

Van der Putten was born on 23 January 1968. She has at least one sister. She is in relationship with her previous national team member Petra Beek. They live in Velserbroek and have a son and a daughter.

References

External links
 

1968 births
Living people
Dutch softball players
Olympic softball players of the Netherlands
Softball players at the 1996 Summer Olympics
People from Velsen
Sportspeople from North Holland